Nam Định is a city in the Red River Delta of northern Vietnam. It is the capital of Nam Định Province. The city of Nam Định is 90 km south-east of Vietnam's capital, Hanoi. From August 18–20 of each year, there is a festival held in Nam Định called the Cố Trạch. This celebration honors General Trần Hưng Đạo, a 13th-century national hero who led Vietnamese forces to victory over the invading Mongols.

Sports
Nam Định has two sports facilities, Thiên Trường Stadium (formerly Cuối Stadium) and Trần Quốc Toản Indoor Stadium, which are host to football and volleyball matches. Both sports centers are located on Hùng Vương Street.

Hà Nam Ninh won the National Football Champions (V.League) in 1985 with star player Nguyễn Văn Dũng. In 2001, Nam Định took second place in the National Championships, losing to Bình Định F.C. In 2007, the Nam Định football team changed its name to Đạm Phú Mỹ Nam Định and won its first National Cup under its new name. In 2009 the Nam Định Football team changed its name to Megastar Nam Định F.C and failed in standing on V.League to 1st level tournament 2010.

Climate

Culture 
Religious sites in Nam Định city include Trần Temple, Phổ Minh Temple, Nam Định Church (Archdiocese of Hanoi) and Khoái Đồng Church (Diocese of Bùi Chu).

Museums in Nam Định include the Nam Định Textile Museum.

Sister cities
 Mỹ Tho
 Prato

Notable people

Phạm Văn Thuần (born 1992), Vietnamese footballer

References

External links
Official site of Nam Định Government

 
Provincial capitals in Vietnam
Populated places in Nam Định province
Districts of Nam Định province
Cities in Vietnam